Patrik Åke Kalli (born  in Härnösand) is a Swedish wheelchair curler.

He participated at the 2010 Winter Paralympics where Swedish team won a bronze medal, and at the 2014 Winter Paralympics where Swedish team finished on seventh place.

Wheelchair curling teams and events

References

External links 

Profile at the Official Website for the 2010 Winter Paralympics in Vancouver
Patrik KALLIN | Wheelchair Curling | Sweden - Sochi 2014 Paralympic winter Games

Living people
1979 births
People from Härnösand
Swedish male curlers
Swedish wheelchair curlers
Paralympic wheelchair curlers of Sweden
Wheelchair curlers at the 2010 Winter Paralympics
Medalists at the 2010 Winter Paralympics
Paralympic bronze medalists for Sweden
Paralympic medalists in wheelchair curling
Swedish curling champions
Sportspeople from Västernorrland County
21st-century Swedish people